is a dissolved village once belonging to the Kanra District in the south-western portion of Gunma Prefecture. It presently corresponds to Osaka region in Shimonita.

Geography
Rivers: Kabura River, Osaka River

History
April 1, 1889: Kami Osaka, Naka Osaka, Shimo Osaka, and Higashino merge into Kita-Kanra District, .
April, 1890: Sakamaki is renamed to Osaka.
April 1, 1950: Kita-Kanra District is renamed to Kanra District.
March 10, 1955: Shimonita, Saimoku, Aokura, and Mayama are abolished and replaced by a new Shimonita.

Dissolved municipalities of Gunma Prefecture
Shimonita, Gunma